Matthew Francis McGuire (May 30, 1898 – January 24, 1986) was a United States district judge of the United States District Court for the District of Columbia.

Education and career

Born in St. John's, Newfoundland, McGuire received an Artium Baccalaureus degree from the College of the Holy Cross in 1921 and a Bachelor of Laws from Boston University School of Law in 1926. He was in the United States Navy in 1918. He entered private practice in Boston, Massachusetts in 1926. He served in the United States Department of Justice from 1934 to 1941, as a special assistant to the Attorney General of the United States from 1934 to 1939, and as an Assistant to the Attorney General of the United States from 1940 to 1941.

Federal judicial service

McGuire was nominated by President Franklin D. Roosevelt on July 14, 1941, to an Associate Justice seat on the District Court of the United States for the District of Columbia (Judge of the United States District Court for the District of Columbia from June 25, 1948) vacated by Associate Justice Peyton Gordon. He was confirmed by the United States Senate on July 29, 1941, and received his commission on August 1, 1941. He served as Chief Judge from 1961 to 1966 and as a member of the Judicial Conference of the United States from 1961 to 1967. He assumed senior status on October 7, 1966. His service terminated on January 24, 1986, due to his death in Washington, D.C.

Note

References

Sources
 

1898 births
1986 deaths
Judges of the United States District Court for the District of Columbia
United States district court judges appointed by Franklin D. Roosevelt
20th-century American judges
United States Navy sailors